Ramatšeliso is a community council located in the Qacha's Nek District of Lesotho. Its population in 2006 was 6,189.

Villages
The community of Ramatšeliso includes the villages of Ha Boloumane, Ha Botala, Ha Jakopo, Ha Makeoane, Ha Makoae, Ha Mojaki, Ha Monyane, Ha Ntai, Ha Popi, Ha Ramahlaela, Ha Ramatšeliso, Ha Rankakala, Ha Semethe, Hill Top, Libataneng, Lifariking, Likotopong, Lioling, Liqaleng, Makhoareng,
Makong, Mapakising, Mpondofong, Paneng and Sekolong.

References

External links
 Google map of community villages

Populated places in Qacha's Nek District